Bjørn Erik Sandsten  is a Norwegian handball player.

He made his debut on the Norwegian national team in 1958, 
and played 21 matches for the national team between 1958 and 1966. He participated at the 1961 World Men's Handball Championship.

References

Year of birth missing (living people)
Living people
Norwegian male handball players